The Château de Guirbaden (or Girbaden) is a ruined castle in the commune of Mollkirch in the Bas-Rhin département of France.

It is situated in the Guirbaden forest, near the village of Mollkirch on the left bank of the Magel River, at an altitude of 565 m. The castle covers a larger area than any other in Alsace. Dating from the 11th century, over more than 500 years it suffered several attacks, destructions and reconstructions.

Privately owned, it has been listed since 1898 as a monument historique by the French Ministry of Culture.

See also
 List of castles in France

Notes and references

External links

 
 Description and history of the castle on Chateau.over-blog.net 
 Unofficial site 
 Numerous photos

Ruined castles in Bas-Rhin
Monuments historiques of Bas-Rhin
Imperial castles
Girbaden